The following are official state symbols of the U.S. state of Florida, as defined by state statutes. The majority of the symbols were chosen after 1950; only the two oldest symbols—the state flower (chosen in 1909), and the state bird (chosen in 1927), and the state nickname (chosen in 1970)—are not listed in the 2010 Florida Statutes. Under the Florida Statutes, all state symbols fall under the purview of the Executive Branch (Title IV), Secretary of State (Chapter 15), as part of the Secretary of State's role as "Chief Cultural Officer."

Insignia

Florida plants

Fauna

Geology

Culture

State quarter

See also
List of Florida-related topics
Lists of United States state insignia
State Fruit of Florida
State of Florida

Notes
 The state song was originally selected through a House Concurrent resolution in 1935, but was defined by statute (with revised lyrics) in 2008.

References

External links
 Florida State Symbols, from the Office of Cultural and Historical Programs, State of Florida

State symbols
Florida